Werner Krien (7 March 1912 – 6 March 1975) was a German cinematographer.

Selected filmography
 Black Roses (1935)
 Women for Golden Hill (1938)
 Triad (1938)
 The Strange Monsieur Victor (1938)
 Twelve Minutes After Midnight (1939)
 Detours to Happiness (1939)
 Riding for Germany (1941)
 Above All Else in the World (1941)
 Münchhausen (1943)
 Große Freiheit Nr. 7 (1944)
 A Wife for Three Days (1944)
 Somewhere in Berlin (1946)
 And the Heavens Above Us (1947)
 Trouble Backstairs (1949)
 Tromba (1949)
 The Great Mandarin (1949)
 The Murder Trial of Doctor Jordan (1949)
 Beloved Liar (1950)
 The House in Montevideo (1951)
 Hanna Amon (1951)
 Towers of Silence (1952)
 Ave Maria (1953)
 The Blue Hour (1953)
 His Royal Highness (1953)
 Portrait of an Unknown Woman (1954)
 One Woman Is Not Enough? (1955)
 Roses in Autumn (1955)
 The Golden Bridge (1956)
 Queen Louise (1957)
 Salzburg Stories (1957)
 Goodbye, Franziska (1957)
 The Trapp Family in America (1958)
 A Woman Who Knows What She Wants (1958)
 Marili (1959)
 The Ideal Woman (1959)
 Bombs on Monte Carlo (1960)
 La Bohème (1965)

Bibliography
 Shandley, Robert R. Rubble Films: German Cinema in the Shadow of the Third Reich. Temple University Press, 2001.

External links

1912 births
1975 deaths
German cinematographers
Film people from Berlin